Nikola Đurišić (born 23 February 2004) is a Serbian professional basketball player for Mega Basket of the ABA League and the Basketball League of Serbia.

Early life and career 
Đurišić was born in Ghent, Belgium, as his father was playing football professionally. His father is Duško Đurišić, a Montenegrin former professional footballer, and his mother is Vesna Čitaković, a Serbian former professional volleyball player who helped the Serbia national team to win a silver medal at the 2007 European Championship and a bronze at the 2006 World Championship. He spent his early childhood in Belgium, Italy, Turkey, and Germany with his mother as she was playing volleyball, before he moved to Belgrade, Serbia when he was 8. His uncle, Perica Đurišić, a basketball coach, introduced him to the game. 

Đurišić was playing basketball for the KK Banjica youth system before he joined the Mega Basket youth system in 2017. At the 2020–21 Euroleague Basketball Next Generation Tournament, he averaged 16.9 points, 7.6 rebounds, 5.6 assists, and 1.9 steals per game, and won the All-Tournament Team selection.

In May 2022, was named the Euroleague NGT Finals MVP and honored with Euroleague NGT All-Tournament Team, after his team won the Euroleague Basketball Next Generation Tournament for the 2021–22 season.

Professional career 
In September 2020, Mega Basket loaned Đurišić to OKK Beograd for the 2020–21 Basketball League of Serbia. Over 29 regular season games, he averaged 16.3 points, 3.2 rebounds, and three assists per game.

Đurišić made his senior debut in the ABA League for Mega Basket on 11 April 2021 in a 84–76 loss to FMP making only 17 seconds of playing time. On his 18th birthday, 23 February 2022, Đurišić signed his first professional contract with Mega Basket.

National team career 
Đurišić was a member of the Serbia U16 national team that participated at the 2019 FIBA U16 European Championship in Udine, Italy. Over seven tournament games, he averaged 4.7 points, three rebounds, and 1.6 assists per game. He was a member of the Serbia U19 national team at the 2021 FIBA Under-19 Basketball World Cup. Over three tournament games, he averaged 7.7 points, 1.3 rebounds, and 3.3 assists per game.

On 25 February 2022, Đurišić made his debut for the Serbia national team at the 2023 FIBA World Cup Qualifiers, just two days after his 18th birthday. In a 75–63 win over Slovakia, he recorded 7 points, 4 rebounds, one assist, and 3 steals in 20 minutes of playing time.

References

External links 
 Profile at euroleague.net
 Profile at realgm.com
 Profile at eurobasket.com
 Profile at aba-liga.com

2004 births
Living people
ABA League players
Basketball League of Serbia players
Basketball players from Belgrade
KK Mega Basket players
OKK Beograd players
Serbian men's basketball players
Serbian expatriate basketball people in Belgium
Serbian people of Montenegrin descent
Shooting guards
Small forwards
Sportspeople from Ghent